Liu Yu (born 19 January 1982) is a Chinese former freestyle swimmer who competed in the 2004 Summer Olympics.

References

1982 births
Living people
Swimmers from Liaoning
Chinese male freestyle swimmers
Olympic swimmers of China
Swimmers at the 2004 Summer Olympics
Sportspeople from Dandong
Asian Games medalists in swimming
Swimmers at the 2002 Asian Games
Medalists at the 2002 Asian Games
Asian Games gold medalists for China
Asian Games silver medalists for China
21st-century Chinese people